The Thirring model is an exactly solvable quantum field theory which  describes the self-interactions of a Dirac field in (1+1) dimensions.

Definition
The Thirring model is given by the Lagrangian density

This is the unique model of (1+1)-dimensional, Dirac fermions  with a local (self-)interaction. Indeed, since there are only 4 independent fields, because of the Pauli principle, all the quartic, local interactions are equivalent; and all higher power, local interactions vanish.

The correlation functions of the Thirring model (massive or massless) verify the Osterwalder–Schrader axioms, and hence the theory makes sense as a quantum field theory.

Massless case
The massless Thirring model is exactly solvable in the sense that a formula for the -points field correlation is known.

Exact solution
After it was introduced by Walter Thirring, many authors tried to solve the massless case, with confusing outcomes. The correct formula for the two and four point correlation was finally found by K. Johnson; then C. R. Hagen  and B. Klaiber  extended the explicit solution to any multipoint correlation function of the fields.

Massive Thirring model, or MTM
The mass spectrum of the model and the scattering matrix was explicitly evaluated by Bethe Ansatz. An explicit formula for the correlations is not known. J. I. Cirac, P. Maraner and J. K. Pachos applied the massive Thirring model to the description of optical lattices.

Exact solution
In one space dimension and one time dimension the model can be solved by the Bethe Ansatz. This helps one calculate exactly the mass spectrum 
and scattering matrix. Calculation of the scattering matrix reproduces the results published earlier by Alexander Zamolodchikov. The paper with the exact solution of Massive Thirring model by Bethe Ansatz was first published in Russian. Ultraviolet renormalization was done in the frame of the Bethe Ansatz. The fractional charge appears in the model during renormalization as a repulsion beyond the cutoff.

Multi-particle production cancels on mass shell.

The exact solution shows once again the equivalence of the Thirring model and the quantum sine-Gordon model. The Thirring model is S-dual to the sine-Gordon model. The fundamental fermions of the Thirring model correspond to the solitons of the sine-Gordon model.

Bosonization
S. Coleman  discovered an equivalence between the Thirring and the sine-Gordon models. Despite the fact that the latter is a pure boson model, massless Thirring fermions are equivalent to free bosons; besides massive fermions are equivalent to the sine-Gordon bosons. This phenomenon is more general in two dimensions and is called bosonization.

See also 
 Dirac equation
 Gross–Neveu model
 Nonlinear Dirac equation
 Soler model

References

External links
On the equivalence between sine-Gordon Model and Thirring Model in the chirally broken phase

Quantum field theory
Exactly solvable models